The chestnut-backed tanager (Stilpnia preciosa) is a species of bird in the family Thraupidae. It is found in southern Brazil, north-eastern Argentina, eastern Paraguay, and Uruguay. It is closely related to the rarer black-backed tanager, and females of the two species are indistinguishable. This bird is characterized by its green breast, and chestnut colored back. Before research was completed, this animal was often mistaken for a result of a mutated black-backed tanager (Stilpnia peruviana). It is now known that this is not the case, and though the two species are related, they are not in fact the same species. The tanager is not in any danger, and is plentiful in the areas that it resides in. Further studies show that this animal is non-invasive, which simply means that it will not invade areas other than its own region.

References

http://neotropical.birds.cornell.edu/portal/species/overview?p_p_spp=607596 
http://www.birdlife.org/datazone/speciesfactsheet.php?id=9410

chestnut-backed tanager
Birds of Argentina
Birds of the Selva Misionera
Birds of the Atlantic Forest
Birds of the South Region
Birds of Paraguay
Birds of Uruguay
chestnut-backed tanager
Taxonomy articles created by Polbot
Taxobox binomials not recognized by IUCN